Robert Duncan Sherrington (21 January 1902 – 16 March 1966) was an Australian politician. Born in Maryborough, Queensland, he was educated there before becoming a sugar mill chemist and field cane inspector. He was a cane grower from 1943. In 1961, he was elected to the Australian Senate as a Liberal Senator for Queensland. He remained in the Senate until his death in 1966. Bill Heatley was appointed to replace him.

References

Liberal Party of Australia members of the Parliament of Australia
Members of the Australian Senate for Queensland
Members of the Australian Senate
1902 births
1966 deaths
People from Maryborough, Queensland
20th-century Australian politicians